Pələkli (also, Palekli and Pelekli) is a village in the Tovuz Rayon of Azerbaijan.  The village forms part of the municipality of Çatax.

References 

Populated places in Tovuz District